Black Orchid is the fifth serial of the 19th season of the British science fiction television series Doctor Who, which was first broadcast on BBC1 on 1 and 2 March 1982.

The serial is set in an English estate in 1925. In the serial, the alien time traveller the Fifth Doctor (Peter Davison) investigates the murder of two servants during a fancy dress party.

This story was the first purely historical adventure for the Doctor—featuring no science fiction elements save for the TARDIS and the regular cast—since The Highlanders (1966). Sarah Sutton plays two characters in this story.

Plot
11 June 1925: the TARDIS crew encounters Lord Cranleigh's chauffeur, who has been expecting "the Doctor". Lord Cranleigh asks them to stay until the annual ball and offers them costumes. They are introduced to Ann Talbot, Lord Cranleigh's fiancée, who looks identical to Nyssa. When Tegan admires a black flower, Lady Cranleigh explains it is a black orchid and was found on the Orinoco by her son, the famed botanist George Cranleigh.

The Doctor picks a Harlequin outfit to wear to the ball. Ann comes to their room, presenting Nyssa with a dress identical to her own. As the Doctor prepares for the ball, a figure enters his room from a secret passage. The Doctor enters the secret passage, where he finds the dead body of one of the servants. The figure steals the Harlequin costume, joins the party, and attacks Ann Talbot. When a butler rushes to her assistance, the Harlequin strangles him to death before returning the costume to The Doctor's room.

Lord Cranleigh finds the dead butler. The Doctor arrives wearing the Harlequin costume and Ann identifies him as her attacker. The Doctor is arrested for murder, his companions accused of being accessories, and all are taken to the police station. The Doctor clears his name and uses the TARDIS to return to Cranleigh Hall, where the figure has lit the place on fire and taken Nyssa hostage.

The murderer is revealed as George Cranleigh, who disappeared during an expedition into the Brazilian forests. The local natives removed his tongue because they held the Black Orchid sacred. Losing his mind, he was rescued by another tribe. The Doctor convinces George to release Nyssa. Charles approaches his brother to thank him, but George recoils and falls off the roof to his death.

Before the Doctor departs, Ann gives Tegan and Nyssa their costumes as presents and Lady Cranleigh presents the Doctor with a copy of George's book.

Production
This serial was commissioned by producer John Nathan-Turner during a period when the series did not have a Script Editor. Nathan-Turner had originally considered directing this story himself, which would have made him the first producer to do so since Barry Letts during the early 1970s. However, due to time constraints, Nathan-Turner abandoned the idea and hired Ron Jones to direct.

Cast notes
To avoid giving away the plot surprise, Gareth Milne's character was listed as "The Unknown" for Part One and in Radio Times, and as "George Cranleigh" for Part Two. Michael Cochrane, who plays Lord Cranleigh, also appears in the 1989 Seventh Doctor serial Ghost Light. He also appeared in the audio plays No Man's Land and Brotherhood of the Daleks. Ivor Salter had previously played the Morok Commander in The Space Museum and Odysseus in The Myth Makers.

Broadcast and reception

The story was repeated on BBC1 on 31 August and 1 September 1983, achieving viewing figures of 4.4 and 5.0 million viewers respectively.

In the DVD commentary, Peter Davison and Janet Fielding revealed that Black Orchid is not a particular favourite episode of theirs, because they disliked the lack of a science fiction element and thought the script was generally trite.

Paul Cornell, Martin Day, and Keith Topping gave the serial a positive review in The Discontinuity Guide (1995), writing, "A little piece of 20s whimsy sampled into Doctor Who with surprisingly satisfying results."  In The Television Companion (1998), David J. Howe and Stephen James Walker said that the story had high production values and were disappointed it did not lead to more historicals. In 2012, Patrick Mulkern of Radio Times praised the story's variation on the Doctor Who formula and the cast, especially Sutton, who was given more to do. The A.V. Club reviewer Christopher Bahn noted that the story was not realistic and paced in a way that not much happened in the first episode, but felt that this decision allowed for leisurely moments between the TARDIS crew. Though he wrote that the low stakes were a refreshing change, he said that the story's problem was its reliance on Agatha Christie-like source material and that it was "an interesting curiosity, but nothing more". DVD Talk's Justin Felix gave Black Orchid three out of five stars, describing it as "a breezy excursion into a melodramatic murder mystery".

Commercial releases

In print

A novelisation of this serial, written by Terence Dudley, was published by Target Books in September 1986. An unabridged reading of the novelisation by actor Michael Cochrane was released on CD in June 2008 by BBC Audiobooks.

Home media
Black Orchid was released in a twin VHS set with The Visitation in July 1994.

On 14 April 2008 it was released on DVD.

On 10 December 2018 it was released as part of the Doctor Who: The Collection - Season 19 boxset, which included an optional extended cut of Episode One running over two and a half minutes longer than the televised version at a total of 27:32.

Critical analysis 
A book length study of the serial, written by Ian Millsted, was published as part of The Black Archive series from Obverse Books in 2016.

The serial was covered in volume 35 of the Doctor Who: The Complete History book series, which reprinted Andrew Pixley's 'Archive' features from Doctor Who Magazine and the various Doctor Who Magazine Special Editions, as well as new articles created specifically for the book.

References

External links

Target novelisation

On Target – Black Orchid

Doctor Who serials novelised by Terence Dudley
Fifth Doctor serials
Fiction set in 1925
Doctor Who historical serials
1982 British television episodes
Television episodes set in England